SVCC may refer to:

 Saddleback Valley Community Church, an Evangelical Christian church in Lake Forest, situated in southern Orange County, in Southern California
 Simi Valley Community Church, also another church located in Simi Valley, California
 Southside Virginia Community College, one of the 23 schools in the Virginia Community College System, sharing the same acronym with the Southwest Virginia Community College below
 Southwest Virginia Community College, also another one of the 23 schools in the Virginia Community College System, sharing the same acronym with the Southside Virginia Community College above
 Student Volunteer Campus Community may refer to SVCC Language Schools, a non-profit volunteer organization located in Edmonton, Alberta Canada
 Serenity Village Community Church, may refer to a Recovery based Christian church in Crystal, MN.